Jacey Eckhart is a military life consultant based in Washington, DC. She is a nationally syndicated military columnist and author of several publications.

Biography 
Eckhart wrote over 400 newspaper columns for The Virginian-Pilot, in Norfolk, Virginia, using  her knowledge and experience with military life.  She wrote the book The Homefront Club: the Hardheaded Woman's Guide to Raising a Military Family to help spouses going through the different aspects of the life they have found themselves married into.

She has also voiced the CD These Boots: A Spouse's Guide to Stepping Up and Standing Tall during Deployment. She continues to write a column for Operation Homefront, on their website. She continues to speak at different engagements, across the country, inspiring military spouses. She is a member of the National Speakers Association and the American Society for Training and Development.

Eckhart was selected as one of the most influential military spouses in the country by Military Spouse Magazine.

Works

References

External links 

 

American military writers
Living people
Women military writers
Year of birth missing (living people)